"Fill Us with Fire" is a single by English synthpop duo Erasure, released as the third single from their 2011 album Tomorrow's World. The song was written by Andy Bell and Vince Clarke, whilst it was produced by electropop musician Frankmusik who produced the rest of the Tomorrow's World album. The B-side "Shot to the Heart" was also written by the duo, but produced by Clarke. This was the final single from Tomorrow's World in all territories except Germany, where "A Whole Lotta Love Run Riot" was released as a download single only.

Track listings
CD Single (UK and Europe) CD MUTE 479
"Fill Us with Fire" (Single Mix) – 3:17   
"Shot to the Heart" – 3:17   
"Fill Us with Fire" ("Fired Up" Mix by Gareth Jones) – 7:22   
"A Whole Lotta Love Run Riot" (Wayne G & Andy Allder Atlantis Anthem) - 7:28   
"Fill Us with Fire" (JRMX Club) - 7:23   
"A Whole Lotta Love Run Riot" (XOQ Remix) - 5:47   
"Fill Us with Fire" (Liam Keegan Remix) - 6:08   
"Be with You" (Yiannis Unruly Mix) - 7:35

References

2012 singles
Erasure songs
Songs written by Vince Clarke
Songs written by Andy Bell (singer)
Mute Records singles
2011 songs
Articles containing video clips